Jan Karel, Baron van Goltstein (30 May 1794, Arnhem – 17 February 1872, The Hague) was a Dutch lawyer and independent politician. He became a member of the House of Representatives of the Netherlands in 1840. He was president of the House of Representatives of the Netherlands twice in the periods 19 February 1849 - 20 August 1850 and 19 September 1856 - 11 March 1858. From 5 March 1858 to 23 February 1860 he was the foreign minister in the Rochussen cabinet. Afterwards he was a member of the House of Representatives of the Netherlands for another 9 years and a member of the senate for 1.5 years.

Sources
http://www.parlement.com/9291000/biof/02049

|-

1794 births
1872 deaths
Commanders of the Order of the Netherlands Lion
Members of the House of Representatives (Netherlands)
Members of the Senate (Netherlands)
Ministers of Foreign Affairs of the Netherlands
Ministers of State (Netherlands)
People from Arnhem
Speakers of the House of Representatives (Netherlands)
Utrecht University alumni